Ash v. Childs Dining Hall Company, 231 Mass. 86, 120 N.E. 396, 4 A.L.R. 1556

Facts
Plaintiff was injured by a tack in her blueberry pie at the defendant’s restaurant.  Pie was made by the defendant on its premises. Blueberries came in ordinary quart berry baskets, from which the tack was probably from. It is uncertain where it came from, however.

Procedural posture
In the Supreme Court of MA—same judge as in Friend v. Childs Dining Hall Co.

Issue
Can a restaurant can be held liable under tort for serving food resulting in injury in the absence of evidence of negligence?

Holding
Not here.

Analysis
Court:
This is an action of tort. It rests solely on allegations of negligence. 
It is well settled that the duty rests upon the keeper of an inn, restaurant, or other eating place to use due care to furnish wholesome food, fit to eat. Failure in this respect resulting in injury is the foundation for an action for negligence. 
Court says that in this case, the defendant showed negligence
Court says that there is nothing in the record from which it can be inferred that the harm to the plaintiff resulted directly from any failure of duty on the part of the defendant. The precise cause of her injury is left to conjecture. Normally, under such circumstances, the plaintiff does not have the responsibility of proving the tort conduct on the defendant and the verdict should be directed accordingly. 
The tack was small and black and would have easily escaped careful scrutiny. The carelessness of somebody the defendant was not responsible for might have caused the tack to be in the pie
The mere fact of injury does not show negligence. The burden of proof rests upon the plaintiff to establish that fact must be sustained by evidence either direct or inferential. Decision that led to appeal is sustained.

Arguably, Friend abandoned her cause of action in tort because she thought of eating there as a sale under the St. 1908, c. 237 §15 Uniform Sales Act. Ash did not plead cause of action in contract because thought that it was a more clear-cut case of negligence (which falls under tort). I don’t think that it would have made a difference if they ate together.  Ash v. Childs compared to Friend v. Childs:  Ash has the better case.  Nevertheless: Friend pursued a contract argument and won. Ash pursued a torts argument and lost. Friend originally pursued a tort argument but abandoned that. Ash probably didn’t pursue contract argument because there is a contract of privity of contract and Ash didn’t pay for the bill.  Why didn’t Ash win?  Failed to prove negligence- to win a product liability case in tort, you need to be able to prove negligence. Contract relieves you of that

Statutory issue
Whether there was a sale or not, court decides there is sale
Whether there was an examination of goods, court decides it doesn’t apply here 
Contributory negligence is not a defense; there was a contract in place

See also 
 Friend v. Childs Dining Hall Co.

Massachusetts state case law
Childs Restaurants
Law articles needing an infobox